Moon on a Rainbow Shawl is a 1957 play written by Trinidadian actor-playwright Errol John. Described as "ground-breaking" and "a breakthrough in Britain for black writing," the play has been produced and revived worldwide since its premiere at London's Royal Court Theatre.

Plot summary 

Set in Port of Spain, Trinidad, the play opens on a hot, late evening in the yard of two dilapidated buildings. Ephraim is just returning from his work as a trolleybus conductor, and converses with Esther Adams, left home alone with her newborn brother. Esther, a very intelligent and studious girl, discusses how her family cannot afford for her to go to high school. Ephraim, secretly envious of her youth and opportunity to make a better life for herself than he has, encourages her. Esther's mother, Sophia comes home. Later, while Ephraim is sleeping, Rosa, Ephraim's lover, returns to the yard with their landowner and her employer, Old Mack. She is wearing solid gold earrings and other things that Old Mack has given her. Old Mack forces himself on Rosa despite her protests and struggles. Sophia, overhearing all this, interrupts him, and he leaves. Sophia tells Rosa that because she is proudly wearing his gifts "he is right to seek his rights". She then asks Rosa if she has "told" Ephraim yet, to which she responds that she has not. Rosa goes and wakes Ephraim. After kissing and her asking him if he would like to sleep with her, Ephraim rolls over and tells her to leave.

The next morning, policemen are investigating the café at which Rosa works. While Ephraim secretly listens, Rosa tells Sophia that it was robbed and that she also intends to "tell" Ephraim later that night. Rosa leaves with a policeman who makes her return to the café. Ephraim goes into the yard, and Sophia suspects that Ephraim is "up to something". Charlie, Sophia's husband, comes home drunk. When Rosa returns and sees Charlie, she immediately goes to her room.

That evening, Rosa tries to seduce Ephraim, but he will not sleep with her. Rosa discloses that she found Charlie's hat at the café, so she knows that he robbed the café. Due to this and the police's questioning, she fears that they will arrest Charlie. Ephraim yells at her endangering the Adams family when the wealthy, stingy Old Mack "could well afford to lose" the money stolen, and for accepting and wearing his expensive gifts. Ephraim tells her he is leaving for Liverpool the following day. Rosa reveals that she is pregnant with his child, which does not sway his decision to leave. Rosa, furious, leaves.

The next day, Charlie, fearful that Old Mack's employee, Stephen, is going to be arrested for his crime, confides to Sophia that he robbed the café, and then went drinking. As Sophia suggests that they have Rosa speak to Old Mack and return the remaining money, Ephraim, overhearing the conversation, and demands that Sophia give him the money so he return it without Charlie being implicated. At this moment, the police show up, and, seeing this exchange, arrest Charlie.

Later that afternoon, Esther returns to an empty home. Sophia, unable to pay bail, comes home and tells Esther what has occurred. Distraught, Esther blames her mother and runs off. Rosa informs Sophia that Old Mack said "the matter was out of his hands", and that she has given up on Ephraim—despite knowing that he is the father because she has slept with no one else.
In the evening, Ephraim is packing, and Sophia returns home after futilely searching for Esther. In spite of Sophia confronting him about abandoning a pregnant Rosa, Ephraim leaves the yard in a taxi. Sophia tries to comfort Rosa that she will be supported, but her words are interrupted by the sound of Old Mack calling from Rosa's room. The play ends with Esther's return, warmly calling for her mother.

Characters 

Ephraim: A young man who feels trapped in a Trinidadian society where opportunity and upward mobility is scarce and the rich abuse the poor. He wants more out of life, and sees Charlie's life as a future parallel to his own—barely scraping by, poor, and with dreams that can never be fulfilled.

Sophia Adams: A spirited although physically and emotionally exhausted woman, who is wife to Charlie and mother to Esther and her newborn boy. She cares fiercely for Esther's future, wants her to have a life outside of the yard and not end up like Mavis, and practices tough love on Esther and Charlie as a result. She also looks after Rosa as if she was family, and even offers to help her take care of her child when it is born.

Rosa: A young woman who was orphaned and subsequently raised by Nuns. Ephraim was the first and only man she had sex with as he asked her as she did not know how to she sought assistance from sophia as thought she was her mother but as Ephraim telling her that he was leaving,
 though she was pregnant thus she had to be with Old Mack so her child can have a father, is one of a loss and corruption of innocence.

Old Mack: A 65-year-old, wealthy man. He owns the shacks that the Adams’, Ephraim, Rosa, and Mavis live in, as well as the café where Rosa works. Sophia notes that "he is a man [she’s] never [known] to be generous," showing that his gifts to Rosa are obvious signs of his affection. His miserly nature propels the conflict that occurs in the play.

Esther Adams: Sophia and Charlie Adams’ daughter. Young, bright and motivated, Esther represents a possibly positive future for Trinidad. The final stage directions note that Esther's call for her mother "should give the impression that the future could still be hers."

Charlie Adams: A former cricket player, who had dreams of playing professionally but was unable to achieve them because of the institutional racism he experienced. He is extremely supportive of his daughter and her efforts and, shown by his actions in the play, wants a bright and prosperous future for Esther.

Mavis: A prostitute who lives in the yard and whom Sophia detests. In the play, Mavis and her boyfriend (later fiancé) Prince serve primarily as comic relief.

Prince: Mavis’ boyfriend and foil. He is not particularly fond of her profession, and proposes to her during the course of the play in an attempt to stop her from seeing Americans as clients and as an apology for striking her.

Stage productions

Original 1958 cast and revised 1962 cast 
The play in its first incarnation was staged at the Royal Court Theatre, London, on December 4, 1958. The cast was as follows:
 Earle Hyman as Ephraim
 Jacqueline Chan as Esther
 Barbara Assoon as Mavis
 Robert Jackson as American Soldier
 Vinnette Carroll as Sophia
 Lionel Ngakane as Old Mack
 Soraya Rafat as Rosa
 Johnny Sekka as Policeman
 Berril Briggs as Janette
 Leo Carera as Prince
 John Bouie as Charlie
 Leonard Davies as American Soldier
 Clifton Jones as Young Murray

The revised version of the play was first staged on January 15, 1962, at the East 11th Street Theatre, New York. The cast was as follows:
 James Earl Jones as Ephraim
 Robert Hill II as Ketch
 Kelly Marie Berry as Esther Adams
 Cicely Tyson as Mavis
 Michael Barton as Sailor
 Vinnette Carroll as Sophia Adams
 Melvin Stewart as Old Mack
 Ellen Holly as Rosa
 Ronald Mack as Policeman
 Bill Gunn as Prince
 Robert Earl Jones as Charlie Adams
 Peter Owens as Soldier
 Carolyn Strickland as Janette
 Wayne Grice as A Boy
 Warren Berry as Taxi Driver

Notable revivals 

In 1988 the Almeida Theatre, London, revived the play, directed by Maya Angelou. March 2012 saw a revival at the National Theatre about which The Observer′s Kate Kellaway wrote: "Michael Buffong's entertaining production is tender and true."

Awards and nominations

References 

1958 plays
Trinidad and Tobago plays